Mirosław Pych (born 15 March 1972 in Słubice) is a Paralympic athlete from Poland competing mainly in category P12 pentathlon events.

He competed in the 1992 Summer Paralympics in Barcelona, Spain. There he won a gold medal in the men's Pentathlon - B2 event, a bronze medal in the men's 100 metres - B2 event and finished fourth in the men's Javelin throw - B2 event. He also competed at the 1996 Summer Paralympics in Atlanta, United States. There he won a gold medal in the men's Pentathlon - P11 event, a gold medal in the men's Javelin throw - F11 event, a silver medal in the men's 100 metres - T11 event and finished eighth in the men's Long jump - F11 event.  He also competed at the 2000 Summer Paralympics in Sydney, Australia. There he won a gold medal in the men's Pentathlon - P12 event and a gold medal in the men's Javelin throw - F12 event.  He also competed in the 2004 Summer Paralympics in Athens, Greece. There he won a silver medal in the men's Javelin throw - F12 event and did not finish in the men's Pentathlon - P13 event. He also competed at the 2008 Summer Paralympics in Beijing, China. There he won a bronze medal in the men's Javelin throw - F11-12 event.

External links
 

Living people
1972 births
People from Słubice
Sportspeople from Lubusz Voivodeship
Paralympic athletes of Poland
Polish male sprinters
Polish male javelin throwers
Athletes (track and field) at the 1992 Summer Paralympics
Athletes (track and field) at the 1996 Summer Paralympics
Athletes (track and field) at the 2000 Summer Paralympics
Athletes (track and field) at the 2004 Summer Paralympics
Athletes (track and field) at the 2008 Summer Paralympics
Paralympic gold medalists for Poland
Paralympic silver medalists for Poland
Paralympic bronze medalists for Poland
Medalists at the 1992 Summer Paralympics
Medalists at the 1996 Summer Paralympics
Medalists at the 2000 Summer Paralympics
Medalists at the 2004 Summer Paralympics
Medalists at the 2008 Summer Paralympics
Paralympic medalists in athletics (track and field)
21st-century Polish people
20th-century Polish people
Visually impaired javelin throwers
Visually impaired sprinters
Paralympic javelin throwers
Paralympic sprinters